Xyrosaris obtorta is a moth of the family Yponomeutidae. It is known from the Rodrigues island of the Republic of Mauritius in the Indian Ocean.

See also
List of moths of Mauritius

References
 

Yponomeutidae
Fauna of Rodrigues
Moths of Mauritius
Moths described in 1924